This is a list of car platforms created by the multinational automotive manufacturing corporation Stellantis.

Pre-existing platforms

The following platforms were inherited in 2021 when the Stellantis corporation was created:

Chrysler
Chrysler LX platform
Wrangler JL platform
Ram DT platform
Chrysler RU platform
Jeep WS platform
Jeep WL platform
Chrysler KL platform

Fiat
Fiat Mini platform
Fiat Small platform
Fiat Compact platform
FCA Giorgio platform
Maserati M156 platform

PSA
PSA EMP1 platform
PSA EMP2 platform

Electric vehicle  platforms
In 2021 Stellantis announced plans to create new shared platforms as part of their electric vehicle (EV) strategy. The group plans to have 39 electrified vehicle models available by the end of 2021. There are four EV platforms with configurable drivetrains planned to be developed by the end of the 2020s:

 STLA Small, for B/C-segment vehicles (based on PSA EMP1/CMP platform)
 STLA Medium, for C/D-segments (based on PSA EMP2 platform)
 STLA Large, for D/E/F-segments (based on Giorgio platform)
 STLA Frame, for large trucks and light commercial vehicles (based on RAM DT platform)

See also
Stellantis
:Category:Stellantis platforms
List of Chrysler platforms
List of PSA platforms
List of Fiat platforms

References

Stellantis platforms
Manufacturing-related lists